New Fantasy is an album by Argentine composer, pianist and conductor Lalo Schifrin recorded in 1964 and released on the Verve label.

Reception
The Allmusic review states "Schifrin often succeeds brilliantly in his own big-band idiom, loaded with trademarks that would pop up in some of his better film and TV scores".

Track listing
 "Prelude #2" (George Gershwin) - 5:00
 "The Peanut Vendor" (Marion Sunshine, Moises Simons) - 6:00
 "Bachianas Brasileiras #5 (Heitor Villa-Lobos) - 3:50
 "New Fantasy" (Larry Green) - 2:30
 "Slaughter on Tenth Avenue" (Richard Rodgers) - 3:07
 "The Blues" (Duke Ellington) - 3:06
 "Sabre Dance" (Aram Khachaturian) - 4:50
 "El Salón México" (Aaron Copland) - 5:20
Recorded at Van Gelder Studios in Englewood Cliffs, New Jersey on June 9 & 10, 1964

Personnel
Lalo Schifrin - piano, arranger, conductor
Marky Markowitz, Ernie Royal, Clark Terry, Snooky Young - trumpet
Jimmy Cleveland, Kai Winding, J. J. Johnson, Urbie Green, Tony Studd - trombone
Ray Alonge, Bob Northern, Richard Berg, Earl Chapin - French horn
Don Butterfield - tuba
Jerome Richardson - flute, tenor saxophone
Mundell Lowe - guitar
George Duvivier - bass
Grady Tate - drums

References

Lalo Schifrin albums
1964 albums
Albums arranged by Lalo Schifrin
Verve Records albums
Albums produced by Creed Taylor
Albums recorded at Van Gelder Studio
Instrumental albums